Jet World Order is an album by rapper Curren$y and his Jet Life crew. It was released on November 29, 2011. The bonus track edition of the album includes a guest appearance from Big K.R.I.T. A bonus loud pack edition of the album was released on the same day and features guest appearances from Cory Gunz, Bun B, Dom Kennedy, Schoolboy Q, Kendrick Lamar, A$AP Rocky and Terri Walker.

Singles
The first single from Jet World Order is "1st Place", produced by Show Off. It was released on November 2, 2011 to iTunes. It features labelmates Curren$y, Trademark Da Skydiver, Young Roddy and Mikey Rocks. The music video for the song was released on December 20.

Critical response
Jet World Order scored a 6.7 from Pitchfork Media, a 3/5 from HipHopDX, and a 7/10 from AllHipHop.

Commercial performance
The album debuted at #148 on the Billboard 200, selling 4,200 copies. It also debuted at #3, #17, and #26 on the Heatseekers Albums, Rap Albums, and Independent Albums charts, respectively.

Track listing

Samples
"The Business" contains a sample of "Completeness" by Jean Carne
"1st Place" contains a sample of "I Am Too Waiting" by Syreeta
"Lop Sided" contains a sample of "Time Is Passing" by Sun
"Money Piles" contains a sample of "You Are What I'm All About" by The New Birth
"Paper Habits" contains a sample of "Liquid Sunshine" by John Cameron

References

2011 albums
Currensy albums
Albums produced by Beat Butcha